Deals Gap (el. ) is a mountain pass along the North Carolina–Tennessee state line, bordering the Great Smoky Mountains National Park and near the Little Tennessee River.

The Dragon

Deals Gap is a popular and internationally famous destination for motorcycle and sports car enthusiasts, as it is along a stretch of two-lane road known since 1981 as “The Dragon” and the "Tail of the Dragon". The  stretch of the Dragon in Tennessee is said to have 318 curves. Some of the Dragon's sharpest curves have names like Copperhead Corner, Hog Pen Bend, Wheelie Hell, Shade Tree Corner, Mud Corner, Sunset Corner, Gravity Cavity, Beginner's End, and Brake or Bust Bend. The road earned its name from its curves being said to resemble a dragon. The stretch bears the street name "Tapoco Road" in North Carolina and "Calderwood Highway" in Tennessee and is signed entirely by US 129 (hidden SR 115).

Since part of the road is also the southwestern border of the Great Smoky Mountains National Park, there is no development along the  stretch, resulting in no danger of vehicles pulling out in front of those in the right of way. It mostly travels through a forested area and there are a few scenic overlooks and pull-off points along the route. The presence of law enforcement on the Tennessee portion has dramatically increased since 2007.

During the summer months, the Blount County Rescue Squad maintains a presence on The Dragon on the weekends to assist Rural/Metro with emergency calls stemming from the frequent motorcycle accidents that occur there, as Rural/Metro dispatches from nearby Maryville, Tennessee, and emergency response times may be in excess of an hour.

Approximately 37 traffic fatalities were recorded on this stretch of road from 2000 to 2017.

In December 2021, YouTuber CGP Grey drove a Tesla Model 3 equipped with the latest beta version of Tesla Autopilot through Deals Gap. The autopilot successfully navigated the route without human intervention.

See also
 MINIs on the Dragon

References

External links
Google Earth view
 Photos and Additional Information for Motorcyclists
 Deals Gap at the Open Directory Project
 Chasing the Tail of the Dragon Reference point article on 2014 Tail of the Dragon (TOD) at Deals Gap, North Carolina

Unincorporated communities in North Carolina
Unincorporated communities in Swain County, North Carolina
Motorcycling subculture in the United States
Communities of the Great Smoky Mountains
U.S. Route 129